Yeniköy is a village in the Gelibolu District of Çanakkale Province in Turkey. Its population is 549 (2021).

References

Villages in Gelibolu District